Derren Ronald Litten (born 21 December 1970) is an English comedy writer and actor, best known as the creator and writer of the sitcom Benidorm. Litten also co-wrote The Catherine Tate Show, for which he both wrote and appeared as several different characters in the first two series and the 2005 Christmas Special. He has also acted in many comedy and drama series including Perfect World, French and Saunders, Spaced, EastEnders, Coronation Street, Pie in the Sky with Richard Griffiths.
Litten's first sitcom was Benidorm, which began airing on ITV in 2007. The series follows various groups of holiday makers and staff in the all-inclusive Solana resort located in Benidorm. The series received strong ratings and later extended its runtime, running for 10 series ending in 2018.

He wrote an episode of Not Going Out and is also the credited writer of an episode of the Only Fools and Horses spin-off The Green Green Grass. In 2000, he appeared in an episode of Heartbeat (series 10, episode 1).

In 2012, a one-off sketch was produced for Sport Relief featuring the Benidorm cast. The sketch involved several of the characters singing on Britain's Got Talent.

Litten also wrote a remake episode of Are You Being Served? which three of the cast had previously appeared in Benidorm, Sherrie Hewson, John Challis and Niky Wardley. It was poorly received by critics.

Career
Litten studied acting at The Central School of Speech and Drama where he met Catherine Tate.   He left Central in 1993 and worked as a jobbing actor for 10 years appearing in shows such as Green Wing, Pie in the Sky, Spaced, French & Saunders, Doc Martin, Eastenders, Casualty and Perfect World but it was not until 2003 when Catherine asked Litten to write sketches for her TV show.  Litten agreed despite having no experience in script writing, or indeed any formal qualifications at all having left Hessle High School (East Yorkshire) without a single O level or GCSE.   In 2004, Litten was nominated for a BAFTA Craft award in the category of Best New Writer.

After two series and a Christmas Special (2005) writing for and appearing in The Catherine Tate Show, Litten met writer John Sullivan who asked if he would be interested in contributing to his Only Fools & Horses spin off The Green Green Grass.  Litten wrote one episode and co-wrote another with Sullivan.

In 2006, Litten penned his own comedy for ITV based in a Spanish all-inclusive holiday resort. Benidorm turned out to be a ratings hit for ITV and was also won for a BAFTA in the category of Situation Comedy.  From series 3 onwards the half-hour sitcom was turned into an hour-long show.  In October 2011, Constable & Robinson published Litten's book to accompany the series, The Benidorm Guide to A Happy Holiday. Benidorm has won numerous awards including seven National Television Awards.

In January 2013, Sky Living announced its new sitcom The Spa, written and created by Litten and starring Rebecca Front, would air from 7 February 2013.  In this series, Litten also plays a regular character, Marcus, an overweight fitness instructor who uses a wheelchair.

In 2016, Litten wrote the script for the pilot episode for the remake of Are You Being Served? The remake starred Jason Watkins, Sherrie Hewson, Roy Barraclough and Justin Edwards. Although Litten was preparing for a whole series, the BBC cancelled the revival after the first episode aired.

Litten wrote and directed the sitcom Scarborough for the BBC. It started airing in September 2019. It was poorly received by critics, and cancelled after one series.

Personal life
In 2020, following information that Scarborough had been axed by the BBC, Litten embarked on a new career, purchasing a bar in Benidorm. The bar opened in July 2020 and is named Mateo's Bar after a character in the show. The venue features real-life props from the set of Benidorm, and guest appearances from cast members from the show. In September 2020, due to enforced quarantine rules from COVID-19, Mateo's was temporarily closed.

References

External links

1970 births
Living people
English comedy writers
20th-century English male actors
Male actors from Kingston upon Hull
21st-century English male actors
English male television actors